Kopyly is a village in Poltava Raion, Poltava Oblast, Ukraine. The village has a population of 2,525.

The village is located 3 km southeast of Poltava, within Tereshky village council, at the E 40 chaussee and at the railway line Poltava—Krasnohrad. The largest body of water in the neighbourhood is Vorskla river. Its biggest tributary Kolomak flows into it near the village.

External links
 Kopyly at the Verkhovna Rada of Ukraine site

FC Poltava

Villages in Poltava Raion